The acronym CORDS may refer to: 

 Center for Orbital and Reentry Debris Studies
 Connecting Organizations for Regional Disease Surveillance
 Civil Operations and Revolutionary Development Support, a pacification program of the U.S. in the Vietnam War 
 Cords Cable Industries Limited, an India-based multinational corporation  

Cords may also refer to:
 Cords (album), an electronic music album by Larry Fast

See also 

Corduroy, a ridged velvet fabric